Faura may refer to:
 Faura, a municipality in the Valencian Community, Spain
 Óscar Faura (born 1975), Spanish cinematographer